S. slevini may refer to:
 Sauromalus slevini, the Monserrat chuckwalla, a large lizard species
 Sceloporus slevini, a spiny lizard species in the genus Sceloporus
 Stenodactylus slevini, the Slevin's short-fingered gecko, a reptile species

See also
 Slevini (disambiguation)